The 2018–19 Magyar Kupa, known as  for sponsorship reasons, was the 61st edition of the tournament.

Schedule
The rounds of the 2018–19 competition are scheduled as follows:

Matches 
A total of 52 matches were take place, starting with Pre-qualifying on 29 August 2018 and culminating with the Final on 7 April 2019.

Pre-qualifying
The pre-qualifying round ties was scheduled for 29 August – 2 September 2018.

|-
!colspan="3" style="background:#ccccff;"| 29 August

|-
!colspan="3" style="background:#ccccff;"| 30 August

|-
!colspan="3" style="background:#ccccff;"| 2 September

|}

First round
The first round ties was scheduled for 5–19 September 2018.

|-
!colspan="3" style="background:#ccccff;"| 5 September

|-
!colspan="3" style="background:#ccccff;"| 7 September

|-
!colspan="3" style="background:#ccccff;"| 8 September

|-
!colspan="3" style="background:#ccccff;"| 17 September

|-
!colspan="3" style="background:#ccccff;"| 18 September

|-
!colspan="3" style="background:#ccccff;"| 19 September

|}

Second round
The second round ties was scheduled for 9–17 October 2018.

|-
!colspan="3" style="background:#ccccff;"| 9 October

|-
!colspan="3" style="background:#ccccff;"| 10 October

|-
!colspan="3" style="background:#ccccff;"| 16 October

|-
!colspan="3" style="background:#ccccff;"| 17 October

|}

Third round
The third round ties was scheduled for 13–21 November 2018.

|-
!colspan="3" style="background:#ccccff;"| 13 November

|-
!colspan="3" style="background:#ccccff;"| 14 November

|-
!colspan="3" style="background:#ccccff;"| 19 November

|-
!colspan="3" style="background:#ccccff;"| 20 November

|-
!colspan="3" style="background:#ccccff;"| 21 November

|}

Fourth round
The fourth round ties was scheduled for 3–12 December 2018.

|-
!colspan="3" style="background:#ccccff;"| 3 December

|-
!colspan="3" style="background:#ccccff;"| 9 December

|-
!colspan="3" style="background:#ccccff;"| 11 December

|-
!colspan="3" style="background:#ccccff;"| 12 December

|}

Fifth round
The fifth round ties was scheduled for 12 February – 13 March 2019.

|-
!colspan="3" style="background:#ccccff;"| 12 February

|-
!colspan="3" style="background:#ccccff;"| 15 February

|-
!colspan="3" style="background:#ccccff;"| 12 March

|-
!colspan="3" style="background:#ccccff;"| 13 March

|}

Final four
The final four will be held on 6–7 April 2019 at the Főnix Hall in Debrecen.

Awards
Most valuable player:  Dean Bombač
Best Goalkeeper:

Semi-finals

Bronze medal match

Final

Final standings

See also
 2018–19 Nemzeti Bajnokság I
 2018–19 Nemzeti Bajnokság I/B
 2018–19 Nemzeti Bajnokság II

References

External links
 Hungarian Handball Federaration 
 hetmeteres.hu

Magyar Kupa Men